Louise Viger (1940 – 2018) was a Canadian sculptor.

Viger received a bachelor's degree in visual arts from Laval University and a Master of Fine Arts degree from Concordia University. 

She has held solo exhibits at both the Musée d'art contemporain de Montréal and the Musée national des beaux-arts du Québec and was known for using unusual materials in her sculpture.

Her work is included in the collections of the Musée national des beaux-arts du Québec and the City of Montreal.

References

1940 births
2018 deaths
20th-century Canadian women artists
21st-century Canadian women artists
Artists from Quebec
Université Laval alumni